The Eisenhower Range is a mountain range, about 72 km (45 mi) long and rising to 3,070 m (10,072 ft), which rises between Reeves Névé on the west, Reeves Glacier on the south, and Priestley Glacier on the north and east, in Victoria Land, Antarctica. The range is flat topped and descends gradually to Reeves Névé, but is steep cliffed and marked by sharp spurs along the Priestley Glacier.

Mountains of this range include Mount Baxter (2430 m) and Mount Nansen (2740 m).

The range was mapped in detail by USGS from surveys and US Navy air photos, 1955–63. Named by US-ACAN for Dwight D. Eisenhower, who was President of the United States in 1954, at the time when the U.S. Navy's Operation Deep Freeze expeditions to Antarctica were initiated.

References
 

Mountain ranges of Victoria Land
Scott Coast
Buildings and monuments honoring American presidents